Cutshin is an unincorporated community located in Leslie County, Kentucky, United States. Its post office  closed in 1996.

References

External links
History of Cutshin

Unincorporated communities in Leslie County, Kentucky
Unincorporated communities in Kentucky